Georges Méliès (1861–1938) was a French filmmaker and magician generally regarded as the first person to recognize the potential of narrative film. He made about 520 films between 1896 and 1912, covering a range of genres including trick films, fantasies, comedies, advertisements, satires, costume dramas, literary adaptations, erotic films, melodramas, and imaginary voyages. His works are often considered as important precursors to modern narrative cinema, though some recent scholars have argued that Méliès's films are better understood as spectacular theatrical creations rooted in the 19th-century féerie tradition.

After attending the first demonstration of the Lumière Brothers' Cinematographe in December 1895, he bought a film projector from the British film pioneer Robert W. Paul and began using it to project short films at his theater of illusions, the Théâtre Robert-Houdin, in Paris.  Having studied the principles on which Paul's projector ran, Méliès was able to modify the machine so that it could be used as a makeshift camera. He began making his own films with it in May 1896, founded the Star Film Company in the same year, and built his own studio in Montreuil, Seine-Saint-Denis in 1897. His films A Trip to the Moon (1902), The Kingdom of the Fairies (1903), and The Impossible Voyage (1904) were among the most popular films of the first few years of the twentieth century, and Méliès built a second, larger studio in 1907. However, a combination of difficulties—including American film piracy, standardized film prices set in 1908 by the Motion Picture Patents Company, and a decline in popularity of fantasy films—led eventually to Méliès's financial ruin and the closing of his studio. His last films were made in 1912 under the supervision of the rival studio Pathé, and in 1922–23 Méliès sold his studios, closed the Théâtre Robert-Houdin, and discarded his own collection of his negative and positive prints. In 1925 he began selling toys and candy from a stand in the Gare Montparnasse in Paris. Thanks to the efforts of film history devotées, especially René Clair, Jean George Auriol, and Paul Gilson, Méliès and his work were rediscovered in the late 1920s, and he was awarded the Legion of Honor in 1931.

In the list below, Méliès's films are numbered according to their order in the catalogues of the Star Film Company. In Méliès's numbering system, films were listed and numbered according to their order of production, and each catalogue number denotes about 20 meters of film (thus, for example, A Trip to the Moon, at about 260 meters long, is listed as #399–411). The original French release titles, as well as the original titles used in the US and UK versions of the Star Film catalogues, are listed in the body of the filmography; notable variant titles are provided in smaller text. The parenthetical descriptive subtitles used in the catalogues (e.g. scène comique) are also provided whenever possible. Films directed by Méliès but not originally released by the Star Film Company (such as The Coronation of Edward VII, released by Charles Urban, or The Conquest of the Pole, released by Pathé Frères) are also included. Where available, the list also includes information on whether each film survives, survives in fragmentary form, or is presumed lost. Unless otherwise referenced, the information presented here is derived from the 2008 filmography prepared by Jacques Malthête, augmented by filmographies prepared in the 1970s by Paul Hammond and John Frazer.

List of films

Miscellaneous films

Later projects
Following the revival of interest in Méliès and his work in the late 1920s, he took part in several film projects:
On 16 December 1929, a "Gala Méliès" was held at the Salle Pleyel in Paris in honor of the filmmaker. At the end of the program, after a screening of some of Méliès's films from the 1900s, a new film was projected, described by Méliès's granddaughter Madeleine Malthête-Méliès as follows:
Calling upon the method perfected by Méliès twenty-four years earlier … which allowed action to move from the screen to the stage … the Gala organizers asked him to shoot a very short film; we see him suddenly appear on the screen … Lost in the streets of Paris, he is looking everywhere for the Salle Pleyel … on the wall he sees an enormous Gala poster bearing his picture … He dives head first into the poster. Suddenly, the lights go on in the hall [where the film was projected]. The screen rises and uncovers, in the middle of the stage, a frame to which is nailed the poster we have just seen. Suddenly the paper rips apart and Méliès appears in the flesh.
In 1933, Jean Aurenche and Jacques B. Brunius asked Méliès to make an advertising film for the Régie des Tabacs of France. Méliès's contribution, his final completed work as a film director, was a 28-second sequence featuring two uses of the stop substitution effect. It was reused in Brunius's 1939 film Violons d'Ingres.
In the autumn of 1937, Méliès began work on a new film, Le Métro fantôme, with a scenario by Jacques Prévert. However, Méliès died on 21 January 1938 and the project was not completed.

Dubiously attributed films
The following films are listed without cited sources in the 1974 filmography by Paul Hammond and its revision by John Frazer, but not in the more complete 2008 filmography by Jacques Malthête. None of the following films have catalogue numbers, and all of them, if they existed to begin with, are presumed lost.

Misattributed films
The following films by other directors have occasionally been erroneously credited to Méliès:

Notes

Footnotes

References

Citations

External links 

Melies, Georges
Melies, Georges
Filmography
Lists of French films